Clay Forau Soalaoi, more commonly referred to as Clay Forau, (born 10 October 1976) is a Solomon Islands politician.

He was first elected to Parliament, representing the Temotu Vatud constituency, at the 2006 general election, in April. From 22 April to 5 May, he served briefly as Minister for Justice and Legal Affairs, under Prime Minister Snyder Rini. When Rini was forced to resign in the face of public protests and a motion of no confidence, Forau supported his successor Manasseh Sogavare, and was appointed Minister for Health and Medical Services. He was also a member of Sogavare's Social Credit Party. He held this position until December 2007, when Prime Minister Sogavare was himself ousted in a vote of no confidence and Derek Sikua named a new Cabinet.

In January 2008, he was appointed chairman of the Constitution Review Committee.

In June 2009, Forau replaced Martin Magga as Minister for Health and Medical Services. The latter was "relieved of his ministerial duties on medical grounds" after being hospitalized in Australia and placed on life support.

Retaining his seat in the August 2010 general election, in which he stood as a member of the People's Federation Party, he nonetheless lost his seat in Cabinet. Rather than join the Opposition, he was elected Leader of the Independent Members of Parliament on 30 August. In early April 2011, however, he relinquished this position to join the ranks of the government. Shortly thereafter, he was appointed Minister for Police, National Security and Correctional Services.

On 9 November 2011, he resigned and joined the Opposition, as part of a mass defection which brought down the Philip government two days later. Gordon Darcy Lilo replaced Philip as Prime Minister on 16 November, and reappointed Forau to his previous position five days later.

On 9 February 2012, Lilo sacked Peter Shannel Agovaka as Foreign Minister, for having publicly raised the possibility of establishing diplomatic relations with Russia without awaiting Lilo's approval. On 27 February, Lilo appointed Forau in his place.

Forau lives in Tikopia.

References

External links

Member page on the Parliament website

1976 births
Living people
Premiers of Temotu Province
Members of the National Parliament of the Solomon Islands
People from Temotu Province
Foreign Ministers of the Solomon Islands
Health ministers of the Solomon Islands
Justice ministers of the Solomon Islands